Progress in Community Health Partnerships: Research, Education, and Action is a peer-reviewed medical journal published quarterly by the Johns Hopkins University Press. In each issue, one article is selected for a “Beyond the Manuscript” podcast. All original research articles contain a Community/Policy brief, which describes key findings and recommendations in language accessible to non-researchers. The journal recruits at least one individual from outside academe to be among the peer reviewers for a submitted manuscript.

See also 
 Community-based participatory research
 Participatory action research
 Asset-based community development (ABCD)
 Community organizing

References 

Public health journals
Publications established in 2007
Quarterly journals
English-language journals
Johns Hopkins University Press academic journals

External links 
 
 Progress in Community Health Partnerships at Project MUSE